Shentu is a township-level division situated in Zhangzhou, Fujian, China and is a part of Zhangpu County.
 
Shentu is located in Zhangpu's lowland, near Fujian's sea coast. It is mostly agricultural.

See also
List of township-level divisions of Fujian

References

Township-level divisions of Fujian
Zhangzhou